Paraskevas Prikas (born 17 November 1998) is a Greek professional footballer who plays as an attacking midfielder for Super League 2 club Anagennisi Karditsa.

Honours
Aspropyrgos
Gamma Ethniki: 2018–19

References

1998 births
Living people
Greek expatriate footballers
Expatriate footballers in Albania
Greek expatriate sportspeople in Albania
Kategoria Superiore players
Gamma Ethniki players
Super League Greece 2 players
Football League (Greece) players
Fostiras F.C. players
Enosi Panaspropyrgiakou Doxas players
Almopos Aridea F.C. players
Luftëtari Gjirokastër players
Episkopi F.C. players
Anagennisi Karditsa F.C. players
Association football midfielders
Footballers from Athens
Greek footballers